Ali Rıza Pasha (sometimes spelled Ali Ridha Pasha) led the Ottoman army in 1831 against the mamluk governor in Baghdad after Dawud Pasha refused to give up his office. Ali Rıza Pasha captured the city and Dawud ending the mamluk rule in Baghdad. Baghdad fell in September 1831 after a ten-week-long blockade of the city which caused mass famine.

While Ali Rıza Pasha was able to capture Baghdad and unseat Dawud Pasha, he still had to deal with the mamluks who remained in Baghdad. In order to preserve his power and pacify the mamluks, he gave many of them positions in his government. In the days following his conquest of Baghdad, Ali Rıza Pasha published a firman, or decree, which made him the governing authority over the cities of: Baghdad, Aleppo, Diyarbakr, and Mosul. The firman eventually covered all cities in Iraq.

Ali Rıza Pasha then marched his army south to Basra where he occupied the province ending mamluk rule in 1834.  Ali Rıza Pasha's conquest of Baghdad and Basra brought the provinces under direct rule from Istanbul and subjected them to Tanzimat reforms. Ali Rıza Pasha replaced mamluk governor Dawud Pasha and exiled him to Brusah. After Dawud's departure from the city, Ali Rıza was credited with the return of trade and end to crime. For a short time he was able to control the mafia that was able to control these regions and especially Karbala in the vacuum of a region without government. He promised appointments and estates to mamluk notables and continued past privileges of the East India Company.

In the summer of 1835, Ali Rıza Pasha attempted to attack the town of Karbala with an army of 3,000. Karbala is an important shrine town in Iraq because Imam Husayn, the grandson of the Islamic prophet Muhammad, is buried there. Karbala is also economically significant because it may levy taxes on pilgrims and earns a significant profit for the local government. Ali Rıza Pasha was unable to keep control of Karbala however. Although he was a member of a Shiite-influenced Bektashi order and sympathized with Iraqi Shiites generally, Rıza Pasha was opposed by the so-called Shiite mafia in Karbala over the appointment of the towns governor. The problems in Karbala were heightened by pressure from the British Empire, who wanted to remain the imperial power of the Awadh government, and the essential link in the Iraqis' communication to the outside world. The serial governor Izzet Ahmed Pasha married his daughter, becoming his son-in-law.

Ali Rıza Pasha appointed ‘Abdu’L-Wahhab in charge of the city of Baghdad. In 1842, after eleven years of governing, Ali Rıza Pasha was replaced by Mehmed Necib Pasha.  Ali Rıza Pasha was transferred from Baghdad to Syria.

Ali Rıza Pasha's personality is more of a mystery than his political and military achievements. His personality is recounted in a Judeo-Iraqi folksong as very courageous and is even likened to that of a lion, but he was most likely admired by Jews because he replaced Dawud Pasha and redistributed land to people living in Karbala. A different account of Ali Rıza Pasha is given by a traveler named J.B. Fraser who visit Iraq in the mid-1800s. Fraser describes Ali Rıza Pasha as “a fat man about fifty years of age, clad in a fur beneesh, with a fez upon his head.” The description of Ali Rıza Pasha continues with Fraser explaining "His mind is not more attractive than the casket which enshrines it. He is weak of judgment, infirm of purpose, irresolute in action, gross in his appetites, selfish and avaricious.

References

Ottoman Army generals
Iraqi pashas
Ottoman governors of Baghdad